Randy Scott Kutcher (born April 20, 1960) is a former Major League Baseball utility outfielder for the San Francisco Giants and Boston Red Sox from 1986 through 1990. He batted and threw right-handed.

Kutcher was born in Anchorage, Alaska. He was a member of two division-winning teams in his three seasons with the Red Sox, in 1988 and 1990, when he and Kevin Romine split duties as reserve outfielders for the Red Sox behind All-Star starters Mike Greenwell, Ellis Burks and Dwight Evans. Kutcher wore jersey number 5 and, later, 55.

In 448 career at bats, Kutcher was a .228 hitter with 10 home runs and 40 runs batted in.

External links

Baseball players from Alaska
1960 births
Living people
Sportspeople from Anchorage, Alaska
San Francisco Giants players
Boston Red Sox players
Major League Baseball outfielders
Pawtucket Red Sox players
Toledo Mud Hens players
Clinton Giants players
Fresno Giants players
Great Falls Giants players
Phoenix Firebirds players
Phoenix Giants players
Shreveport Captains players
Sultanes de Monterrey players
American expatriate baseball players in Mexico